The 2008 Speedway Grand Prix of Scandinavia was the seventh race of the 2008 Speedway Grand Prix season. It took place on August 16, in the G&B Stadium in Målilla, Sweden. The Grand Prix was won by Leigh Adams from Australia. It was his second GP Won in this season.

Riders 

The Speedway Grand Prix Commission nominated Peter Ljung as a wild card, and Jonas Davidsson and Thomas H. Jonasson both as track reserves. The draw was made on August 5 at the FIM Headquarters in Mies, Switzerland.

Heat details

Heat after heat 
 (57.2) Andersen, Holta, Lindgren, Dryml
 (56.9) Iversen, Crump, Nicholls, Jonsson (X) Nicholls crashes on 1st lap - Jonsson excluded
 (58.7) Hancock, Ljung, Harris, B.Pedersen
 (59.2) Adams, N.Pedersen, Gollob, Kasprzak
 (59.4) Kasprzak, Hancock, Crump, Holta
 (59.3) Andersen, N.Pedersen, Iversen, Ljung
 (59.3) Adams, Lindgren, Jonsson, Harris
 (60.1) Dryml, B.Pedersen, Nicholls, Gollob (E/start)
 (59.7) Iversen, Gollob, Harris, Holta (E4)
 (59.5) Andersen, Crump, Adams, B.Pedersen
 (59.8) Hancock, Lindgren, Nicholls, N.Pedersen (E/start)
 (59.8) Jonsson, Kasprzak, Dryml, Ljung
 (59.2) N.Pedersen, Jonsson, B.Pedersen, Holta (E4)
 (60.1) Andersen, Kasprzak, Nicholls, Harris (Fx) Harris crashes and is excluded
 (59.9) Crump, Lindgren, Gollob, Ljung
 (60.0) Adams, Hancock, Dryml, Iversen
 (60.2) Holta, Adams, Ljung, Nicholls (Fx) Holta falls on first lap, Nicholls excluded
 (60.3) Gollob, Hancock, Andersen, Jonsson
 (61.2) B.Pedersen, Kasprzak, Iversen, Lindgren (F4)
 (60.4) N.Pedersen, Crump, Harris, Dryml
 Semi-Finals:
 (59.6) Andersen, N.Pedersen, Iversen, Kasprzak
 (59.8) Adams, Crump, Gollob, Hancock
 The Final:
 (59.7) Adams (6 points), Andersen (4), N.Pedersen (2), Crump (0)

The intermediate classification

See also 
 Speedway Grand Prix
 List of Speedway Grand Prix riders

References

External links 
 www.SpeedwayWorld.tv

Scandinavia
2008
2008 in Swedish motorsport